Chamaelaucium pauciflorum is a member of the family Myrtaceae endemic to Western Australia.

It blooms in between August and October producing white-pink flowers.

Found on plains, ridges and rises in an area extending from the Mid West to the Wheatbelt, Great Southern and western Goldfields-Esperance regions of Western Australia where it grows in sandy or gravelly soils over laterite.

References

pauciflorum
Plants described in 1867